Bayzak is a district of Jambyl Region in south-eastern Kazakhstan. The administrative center of the district is the auyl of Sarykemer.

History 
The district was formed on February 14 1938 under the name Sverdlovsk district. In 1995 it was renamed Bayzaksky. At the end of August 2021, explosions in a military unit occurred in this area, causing significant casualties; national mourning was declared.

References

Districts of Kazakhstan
Jambyl Region